Gal Branch is a stream in Crawford and 
Gasconade counties in the U.S. state of Missouri. It is a tributary of Brush Creek.

Gal Branch was so named for the fact a large share of the early residents were girls.

See also
List of rivers of Missouri

References

Rivers of Crawford County, Missouri
Rivers of Gasconade County, Missouri
Rivers of Missouri